The Eno Center for Transportation is a non-profit, independent organization based in Washington, D.C. with the mission to shape public debate on critical multimodal transportation issues and to build an innovative network of transportation professionals. The Center was created and endowed in Westport, Connecticut, by William Phelps Eno, a pioneer in the field of traffic control.

History 
In 1921, William P. Eno created a corporation whose purpose was to continue his lifetime's work – the promotion of safety on roads and highways. He endowed the Eno Foundation for Highway Traffic Regulation and began the work of attracting other transportation experts and specialists in order to provide a forum for unbiased discussions that would lead to improvements in the movement of people and goods.

On April 21, 1921, Eno published the foundation's articles of association. These articles laid out the purposes of the foundation:
 Devise traffic methods and rules
 Publish information on traffic
 Standardize general highway traffic regulations
 Familiarize the public with traffic laws
 Promote special traffic regulations
 Provide proper instruction of traffic police
 Promote proper understanding by all police that they have general traffic obligations when in uniform
 Furnish advice on traffic regulation generally
 Recommend physical changes, such as widening of roadbeds, to assist the movement of traffic

Vision and Core Values

Eno's vision is for a transportation system that fosters economic vitality, advances social equity, and improves the quality of life for all.

Theory of Change
To achieve its vision, Eno adheres to a four-part theory of change:
 Conduct rigorous research and independent analysis. Eno studies critical issues in transportation, providing recommendations and analyses that shape solutions and inform decision making.
 Act as the Hub of an Extensive Network of Transportation Leaders. Eno convenes and empowers cross-sector networks of government, business, nonprofit, and philanthropic leaders at all levels who work together to solve problems, develop new solutions, and advocate for broader reforms. 
 Develop Policy and Practice Insights. Eno encourages federal, state, and local governments and private sector firms and philanthropies to adopt policy reforms and develop best practices that facilitate innovations and solutions.
 Spread Ideas through Education and Training. Eno translates research and insight into on-the-ground knowledge and action, pilots new strategies, and codifies research through new tools and resources for solutions that can be adapted and scaled.

Eno began to publish Eno Transportation Weekly (ETW), a weekly run-down of current federal transportation related legislation and political action, in 2015. Eno's current President/CEO, Robert Puentes, was appointed in 2016.

Boards

Board of Directors 
The Eno Center for Transportation’s Board of Directors is made up of distinguished leaders from across the transportation field. Board Members bring expertise in all modes of transportation and experience in federal and state government service, as well as the private sector. The Board meets throughout the year to provide strategic direction and assure careful stewardship of resources. Board Members also participate in Eno activities, such as policy forums and leadership development programs.

 James Burnley: Chairman of the Board; former U.S. Secretary of Transportation
 Norman Mineta: Principal, Mineta & Associates; former U.S. Secretary of Transportation Emeritus
 Mary Peters: Principal, Mary Peters Consulting; former U.S. Secretary of Transportation
 Thomas F. Prendergast: Head of Transit, AECOM; former chairman and CEO of the Metropolitan Transportation Authority in New York
 Marjorie J. Dickman: Chief Government Affairs and Public Policy Officer, Blackberry
 Carolyn Flowers: Managing Principal, InfraStrategies LLC; former Acting Administrator of the Federal Transit Administration.
 Keith Parker: President and CEO, Goodwill of North Georgia; former General Manager and CEO, Metropolitan Atlanta Rapid Transit Authority (MARTA)
 Martin T. Whitmer; Principal, Whitmer & Worrall
 Diane Woodend Jones; Chairman of the Board, Lea+Elliott, Inc.; former Chair, WTS international
 Tay Yoshitani; Port of Seattle (retired)
 Karen Rae; Senior Strategic Advisor at STV Inc.; former deputy administrator at the Federal Railroad Administration.

Board of advisors 
The Eno board of advisors provides advice and counsel to Eno's executive leadership, including its board of directors and president and chief executive officer. The members are selected from across industry and government, and possess extensive knowledge and expertise in surface-, air-, and water-based transportation policy, management, and operations. The board meets annually with the board of directors to provide advice on organizational priorities and participate in policy and professional development activities.

 Jennifer Aument: Group General Manager, North America Transurban
 Doran Barnes: Executive Director, Foothill Transit
 Shailen Bhatt: President and CEO, Intelligent Transportation Society of America (ITS America)
 Emily Feenstra: Managing Director of Government Relations and Infrastructure Initiatives, American Society of Civil Engineers
 Kate Fox Wood: Director, Government Relations, Association of Equipment Manufacturers
 Patricia G. Hendren: Executive Director, Eastern Transportation Coalition 
 Kara Kockelman: E.P. Schoch Professor in Engineering, University of Texas at Austin
 Hani Mahmassani: Director, Northwestern University Transportation Center
 Ed Mortimer: Executive Director, Transportation and Infrastructure, U.S. Chamber of Commerce
 A. Bradley Mims: President & CEO, Conference of Minority Transportation Officials
 Thomas O'Brien: Executive Director, Center for International Trade and Transportation, California State University, Long Beach
 Joel Oppenheimer: Senior Vice President, STV Inc.
 Christopher Pangilinan: Head of Global Policy for Public Transportation, Uber
 Neil Pedersen: Executive Director, Transportation Research Board
 Sharon Pinkerton: Senior Vice President, Legislative and Regulatory Policy, Airlines for America
 Paul Rinaldi: President, National Air Traffic Controllers Association
 David Somo: Senior Vice President, Corporate Strategy, Marketing & Solutions Engineering, ON Semiconductor
 Paul Skoutelas: President and CEO, American Public Transportation Association
 Michael Smythers: Vice President of Federal Government Affairs, BNSF Railway
 H. A. “Burt” Tasaico: Director of Strategic Initiatives and Program Support, North Carolina Department of Transportation
 Adie Tomer: Senior Fellow, Brookings Institution Metropolitan Policy Program
 Jannet Walker Ford: Senior Vice President, Transportation Strategy, Growth & Key Accounts for Americas AECOM
 Maggie Walsh: Vice President and Strategic Pursuits Leader for the Transportation Business Group, HDR, Inc.
 Linda Washington: President and CEO, The Washington Consulting Team
 Nicole Young: Vice President Commercial Aviation & Transportation Government Operations, The Boeing Company
 Seth Young: Director, Ohio State University Center for Aviation Studies

Board of Regents 
The Board of Regents supports Eno's educational and professional development programs. Members are selected from across the public and private sectors and share Eno's commitment to creative and visionary leadership in the transportation sector. They select the LDC Fellows, offer advice to improve the value of Eno’s professional development programs, help identify needs in workforce development, and serve as ambassadors to help build relationships across Eno’s alumni network.

 Asha Weinstein Agrawal: Director, Mineta Transportation Institute (MTI) National Transportation Finance Center
 Rhonda Allen: Chief Customer Experience Officer, Metropolitan Atlanta Rapid Transit Authority (MARTA)
 Anthony Barnes: Chief Operating Officer, Airport Minority Advisory Council
 Jonathan Church: Project Manager, McMahon Associates
 Jennifer Dill: Director of the Transportation Research and Education Center (TREC), Portland State University
 Michael Meyer: Consultant
 Jennifer Mitchell: Director, Virginia Department of Rail and Public Transportation
 Steven Polunsky: Director of the Transportation Policy Research Center, University of Alabama
 Billy Terry: Director, National Transit Institute (NTI)
 Melissa S. Tooley: Director of External Initiatives, Texas A&M Transportation Institute

References

External links 

 Official Eno Center for Transportation site
 Eno Research and Resources
 Eno Transportation Weekly
 Simsbury Free Library - William Phelps Eno Memorial Center

Transportation associations in the United States
Political and economic think tanks in the United States